The following is a list of notable deaths in November 2006.

Entries for each day are listed alphabetically by surname. A typical entry lists information in the following sequence:
 Name, age, country of citizenship at birth, subsequent country of citizenship (if applicable), reason for notability, cause of death (if known), and reference.

November 2006

1
Bettye Ackerman, 82, American actress (Ben Casey), stroke.
Jason DiEmilio, 36, American guitarist (Azusa Plane), overdose.
Daniel Garcia, 80, Mexican professional wrestler and actor better known as Huracán Ramírez, heart attack.
Buddy Killen, 73, American record producer, founder of Dial Records, pancreatic cancer.
Florence Klotz, 86, American Tony Award-winning costume designer, heart failure.
Johnny Schofield, 75, British footballer for Birmingham City, former manager of Atherstone Town, complications from an illness.
Adrienne Shelly, 40, American actress (Trust, Unbelievable Truth), screenwriter, director (Waitress), murder by strangulation.
William Styron, 81, American writer (Darkness Visible, Confessions of Nat Turner, Sophie's Choice), pneumonia.
Hilda van Stockum, 98, Dutch Newbery Medal-winning author of children's books, stroke.
Silvio Varviso, 82, Swiss conductor of the Vlaamse Opera, illness.

2
Rafael Donato, 69, Filipino President of DLSU-Manila (1991–1994), President of De La Salle Lipa (1995–2003), drowned.
Adrien Douady, 71, French mathematician.
Hadyn Ellis, 61, Welsh psychologist.
Wally Foreman, 58, Australian sports commentator, heart attack.
Red Hayworth, 91, American baseball player.
Carroll Knicely, 77, American publisher, Commerce Secretary for three Kentucky governors.
Henning Kristiansen, 79, Danish cinematographer and film director (Babette's Feast, Me and Charly).
Leonard Schrader, 62, American screenwriter (Kiss of the Spider Woman, Mishima), brother of Paul Schrader, heart failure.
Derek Turnbull, 79, New Zealand runner.
Milly Vitale, 74, Italian actress, natural causes.

3
Belden Bly, 92, American legislator in the Massachusetts House (1948–1979).
Frank Dunham, Jr., 64, American federal public defender, head lawyer for Zacarias Moussaoui, brain cancer.
Sir Allen Fairhall, 96, Australian member of the House of Representatives (1949–1969), Minister for Defence (1966–1969).
Fereydoun Hoveyda, 82, Syrian-born Iranian ambassador to the United Nations (1971–1979), cancer.
Paul Mauriat, 81, French musician (L'Amour Est Bleu).
Sputnik Monroe, 77, American professional wrestler, respiratory illness.
Malachi Ritscher, 52, American anti-war protester, self-immolation.
Marie Rudisill, 95, American "Fruitcake Lady" on The Tonight Show, aunt of Truman Capote, natural causes.
Stanley Rothenberg, 76, American lawyer, former president of Copyright Society, complications of popliteal aneurysm surgery.
Alberto Spencer, 68, Ecuadorian footballer (Peñarol, Ecuador), highest scorer in Copa Libertadores, infection after heart surgery.

4
Dajan Ahmet, 44, Estonian actor, car accident. 
Brebis Bleaney, 91, British physicist.
Nelson S. Bond, 97, American writer.
William Lee Brent, 75, American Black Panther who hijacked a plane to Cuba, bronchial pneumonia.
Lionel Bryer, 78, South African dentist who founded the Aberdeen International Youth Festival.
Frank Arthur Calder, 91, Canadian aboriginal politician.
Ernestine Gilbreth Carey, 98, American co-author of Cheaper by the Dozen, natural causes.
John McManners, 89, British historian, Regius Professor of Ecclesiastical History at Oxford University (1972–1984).
Sergi López Segú, 39, Spanish footballer for FC Barcelona, brother of Gerard López, suicide under a train.

5
Samuel Bowers, 82, American former Imperial Wizard of the Ku Klux Klan, convicted over murder of Vernon Dahmer, cardiac arrest.
Chen Ding-nan, 63, Taiwanese Justice Minister (2000–2005), lung cancer.
Chuck DeShane, 87, American football quarterback (Detroit Lions).
Bülent Ecevit, 81, Turkish former Prime Minister, complications following a stroke.
George Esser, 85, American civil rights advocate, set up the North Carolina Fund.
Oscar González, 82, Uruguayan Grand Prix driver.
Frank Marsden, 83, British Labour MP (1971–1974).
Pietro Rava, 90, Italian former football player, last surviving member of the 1938 World Cup-winning team, Alzheimer's disease.
Ham Richardson, 73, American tennis player, US Open doubles winner, diabetes complications.
Francis Schuckardt, 69, American Traditional Catholic Bishop, rejected decrees of Second Vatican Council, throat cancer.
Bobby Shearer, 74, Scottish former footballer (Hamilton Academical, Rangers), illness.

6
Miguel Aceves Mejía, 90, Mexican singer and actor known as "the king of the falsetto", bronchitis.
Francisco Fernández-Ochoa, 56, Spanish retired alpine skier, gold medallist in the 1972 Winter Olympic Games, cancer.
Federico López, 44, Puerto Rican basketball player in two Olympic Games and three world championships, heart attack.
J. T. Rutherford, 85, American Democratic Representative for Texas (1955–1963), complications from Alzheimer's disease.

7
Paul Baltes, 67, German developmental psychologist, cancer.
John Coburn, 81, Australian artist, winner of the 1960 and 1977 Blake Prize.
Buddy Kerr, 84, American baseball shortstop (New York Giants), natural causes.
Jackie Parker, 74, American football player, All-American, head coach and general manager, throat cancer.
Bryan Pata, 22, American football player (Miami Hurricanes), shot.
Johnny Sain, 89, American Major League Baseball pitcher, complications from a stroke.
Jean-Jacques Servan-Schreiber, 82, French journalist and politician, complications from bronchitis.
Brian Thomson, 87, British chairman of D.C. Thomson & Co. Ltd (1974–2005).
Polly Umrigar, 80, Indian cricket team captain (1955–1958), lymphoma.

8
Lyudmila Buldakova, 68, Russian volleyball player.
Rhodes Fairbridge, 92, Australian geologist at Columbia University and expert on climate change, brain tumour.
Sir James Hunt, 63, British judge in the Queen's Bench Division of the High Court of Justice, brain tumour.
Lia Looveer, 86, Estonian-born Australian politician.
Basil Poledouris, 61, American film composer (Conan the Barbarian, RoboCop, Starship Troopers), cancer.
Annette Rogers, 93, American athlete, 4 x 100 metres relay gold medalist at the 1932 and 1936 Olympics, stroke.

9
Ed Bradley, 65, American CBS News journalist and 60 Minutes correspondent, leukemia.
Garton del Savio, 92, American baseball player, illness.
Mary R. Grizzle, 85, American politician.
Marian Marsh, 93, American 1930s actress (Hell's Angels, Svengali), respiratory arrest.
Sam Stephenson, 72, Irish architect, designed the Central Bank and Wood Quay, complications from heart surgery.
Ellen Willis, 64, American journalist, professor, feminist activist and critic, lung cancer.
Markus Wolf, 83, German former head of East Germany's secret intelligence service, natural causes.

10
Benny Andrews, 75, American painter, cancer.
Diana Coupland, 74, British actress (Bless This House), complications following heart surgery.
Gabriel Donoso, 46, Chilean polo player, fall from a horse.
Fokko du Cloux, 51, Dutch mathematician and computer scientist, amyotrophic lateral sclerosis.
Maurice Floquet, 111, French supercentenarian.
Doug Friedline, 49, American campaign manager for Jesse Ventura, heart attack.
Gerald Levert, 40, American R&B singer, son of The O'Jays lead singer Eddie Levert, accidental acute intoxication.
Chubby Oates, 63, British Cockney comedian, heart attack.
Jack Palance, 87, American Academy Award-winning actor (Shane, City Slickers), natural causes.
Francisco Quina, 75, Portuguese Olympic sailor 
Nadarajah Raviraj, 44, Sri Lankan Tamil National Alliance MP, shot.
Igor Sergeyev, 68, Russian Defense Minister (1997–2001), the only Marshal of the Russian Federation, cancer.
Jack Williamson, 98, American science fiction author.

11
Anicée Alvina, 53, French actress, lung cancer.
Belinda Emmett, 32, Australian actress (Home and Away), metastatic breast cancer.
Jabu Khanyile, 49, South African musician who played at the Johannesburg Live 8 concert, prostate cancer.
Esther Lederberg, 83, American microbiologist at Stanford, discovered lambda phage, pneumonia and heart failure.
Harry Lehotsky, 49, Canadian anti-poverty advocate and newspaper columnist, pancreatic cancer.
Ronnie Stevens, 81, British comedy actor.
Joop van Domselaar, 78, Dutch Olympic shooter.

12
Alphonse Halimi, 74, French boxer, former world bantamweight champion, pneumonia.
Harvey Manning, 81, American conservationist and author.
Mario Merola, 72, Italian singer and actor, heart attack.
Jacob E. Smart, 97, American Air Force general and NASA executive, former deputy C-in-C of the US European Command.
Joseph Ungaro, 76, American journalist.
H. Donald Wilson, 82, American founder of LexisNexis, heart attack.

13
Desert Orchid, 27, British National Hunt racehorse, winner of the King George VI Chase on four occasions.
Konrad Fuchs, 109, German believed to be oldest living Catholic priest, WWI combat veteran.
Judah Reuben, 84, Indian cricket umpire.

14
Tony Gara, 67, Zimbabwean politician, mayor of Harare, cancer.
John Hallam, 65, Northern Irish actor.
Montague Higgs, 67, Bahamian Olympic sailor 
Bertrand Poirot-Delpech, 77, French writer and journalist.
G. Gordon Strong, 92, Canadian-American publisher, pneumonia.
Pete Suder, 90, American baseball player.
Owen Truelove, 69, British RAF Air Commodore, glider crash.

15
George G. Blackburn, 90, Canadian author (Guns of Normandy), member of the Order of Canada, cancer.
John Blackburn, 93, American songwriter ("Moonlight in Vermont", "Susquehanna"), natural causes.
Ken Ishikawa, 58, Japanese manga artist, co-creator of Getter Robo anime series, heart failure.
Ana Carolina Reston, 21, Brazilian model, complications of anorexia nervosa.
Paul Rigby, 82, Australian cartoonist, heart attack.
David K. Wyatt, 69, American historian of Thailand, emphysema and heart failure.

16
Frank Durkan, 76, Irish-born American lawyer, advocate for members of the Irish Republican Army in the US, lung infection.
Milton Friedman, 94, American monetarist and free-market economist, winner of the 1976 Nobel Prize, heart failure.
Gary Graver, 68, American cinematographer for Orson Welles (F for Fake, The Other Side of the Wind), cancer.
Geoff Griffin, 67, South African cricketer, heart attack.
Yuri Levada, 76, Russian sociologist and pollster, heart attack.
Jack Macpherson, 69, American surfboarder, liver and renal failure.
Paris Theodore, 63, American firearm inventor and manufacturer, multiple sclerosis.
John Veale, 84, British classical composer, cancer.

17
Sir John Acland, 77, British general, commander of forces in Rhodesia (1979–1980).
Ruth Brown, 78, American blues singer, complications of a heart attack and stroke.
Jeffrey O. Hanson, 48, American politician, member of the Minnesota House of Representatives, Creutzfeldt–Jakob disease.
Colin Pinch, 85, Australian cricketer.
Tony Pithey, 73, South African cricketer, pancreatic cancer.
Ferenc Puskás, 79, Hungarian former footballer and coach, pneumonia.
Flo Sandon's, 82, Italian singer, winner of Sanremo Music Festival (1953).
Bo Schembechler, 77, American University of Michigan football head coach (1969–1989), heart problems.
Ramez Tebet, 70, Brazilian politician and lawyer, cancer.

18
Movladi Baisarov, 40, Chechen warlord and commander of Federal Security Service, shot.
Roger Bolton, 59, British trade unionist, cancer.
Maurice W. Graham, 89, American "Patriarch of the Hobos" and author, stroke. 
Keith Rowlands, 70, Welsh CEO of the International Rugby Board.

19
William G. Beasley, 86, British oriental historian.
Dirk Dirksen, 69, American promoter of punk rock.
Sir Edward Ford, 96, British assistant and private secretary to King George VI and Queen Elizabeth II (1946–1967).
Smith Hempstone, 77, American journalist and ambassador to Kenya (1989–1993), complications from diabetes.
Emanuel Hurwitz, 87, British violinist.
Khir Johari, 83, Malaysian Education Minister, heart attack.
Evelyn Keppel, 77, American baseball player (AAGPBL).
Ernest Pusey, 111, American supercentenarian, last Floridian World War I veteran.
Julio Ramos, 71, Argentine journalist, director (Ámbito Financiero), leukemia.
Jeremy Slate, 80, American actor (The Born Losers, The Devil's Brigade), esophageal cancer.

20
Robert Altman, 81, American film director (MASH, Nashville, Short Cuts), complications from leukemia.
Zoia Ceauşescu, 56, Romanian mathematician, daughter of Nicolae Ceauşescu, lung cancer.
William R. P. George, 94, British archdruid, bard, novelist, nephew of Prime Minister David Lloyd George.
Donald Hamilton, 90, American spy fiction writer.
Walid Hassan, 47, Iraqi television comedian, shot.
Chris Hayward, 81, American creator of Dudley Do-Right and The Munsters, illness.
Hong Xuezhi, 94, Chinese general, unspecified illness.
Kevin McClory, 80, Irish film producer (Never Say Never Again).
Saúl Ubaldini, 69, Argentine labor leader and parliamentarian for the Peronist party, lung cancer.
Andre Waters, 44, American football player, suicide.

21
Svein Erik Bakke, 59, Norwegian entrepreneur.
Gheorghe Calciu-Dumitreasa, 80, Romanian priest, dissident Nicolae Ceauşescu's rule, pancreatic cancer.
Dale DeArmond, 92, American artist and librarian, director of the Juneau Memorial Library (1958–1979).
Pierre Gemayel, 34, Lebanese Minister of Industry, shot.
Hassan Gouled Aptidon, 90, Dijiboutian first President, natural causes.
Robert Lockwood, Jr., 91, American blues guitarist and singer, respiratory failure.
Bernard Rimland, 78, American autism researcher, prostate cancer.
Eliezer Waldenberg, 89, Israeli Haredi rabbi.
Sir Harold Young, Australian Liberal politician, President of the Senate (1981–1983).

22
John Allan Cameron, 67, Canadian pioneer of Celtic music, bone cancer.
Muriel Castanis, 80, American sculptor, lung failure.
Pat Dobson, 64, American Major League Baseball pitcher, leukemia.
Gilles Grégoire, 80, Canadian politician and co-founder of Parti Québécois.
Roy Newell, 92, American abstract expressionist painter, cancer.
John Peyton, Baron Peyton of Yeovil, 87, British Minister of Transport (1970–1974) and MP (1951–1983).

23
Jerry Bails, 73, American popular culture and comic book historian, heart attack.
Jesús Blancornelas, 70, Mexican journalist, founding editor of Zeta magazine, stomach cancer.
Gerald M. Boyd, 56, American managing editor of The New York Times, lung cancer.
Nick Clarke, 58, British BBC presenter and journalist, cancer.
Richard Clements, 78, British journalist, editor of Tribune (1961–1982).
Betty Comden, 89, American lyricist known for writing musicals with Adolph Green including Singin' in the Rain, heart failure.
Jack Ferrante, 90, American football player for the Philadelphia Eagles.
Ian Gordon Gill, 86, British army general.
Ştefan Haukler, 64, Romanian Olympic fencer.
Roy M. Hopkins, 63, American politician, member of the Louisiana House of Representatives.
Alexander Litvinenko, 43, Russian spy and critic of Vladimir Putin, poisoning.
Philippe Noiret, 76, French actor (Il Postino, Cinema Paradiso), cancer.
Anita O'Day, 87, American jazz singer, pneumonia.
Willie Pep, 84, American Hall of Fame featherweight boxer, Alzheimer's disease.
Chen-Lu Tsou, 83, Chinese biochemist, member of the Chinese Academy of Sciences and The World Academy of Sciences, cancer.

24
Kwesi Armah, 77, Ghanaian diplomat and politician.
Gilbert Benausse, 74, French rugby league player.
Walter Booker, 72, American jazz bassist (Cannonball Adderley Quintet), cardiac arrest.
John Bridgers, 84, American athletic director at the University of New Mexico, congestive heart failure.
William Diehl, 81, American author (Primal Fear, Sharky's Machine), aortic aneurysm.
Phyllis Fraser, 90, American actress, author, and publisher, complications from fall.
Robert Kupperman, 71, American terrorism expert at the CSIS, complications from Parkinson's disease.
Juice Leskinen, 56, Finnish singer-songwriter, chronic kidney disease, cirrhosis, and diabetes mellitus.
Frank L. Madla, 69, American member of the Texas State Legislature since 1973, house fire.
Robert McFerrin, 85, American singer, father of Bobby McFerrin, heart attack.
Thelma Scott, 93, Australian actress (Number 96), heart attack.
Max Soliven, 77, Filipino publisher of The Philippine Star, cardiac arrest.
George W. S. Trow, 63, American author and media critic, natural causes.
Zdeněk Veselovský, 78, Czech zoologist, heart failure.

25
Luciano Bottaro, 75, Italian comic book creator (Pepito).
Valentín Elizalde, 27, Mexican banda singer, shot.
David Hermance, 59, American Toyota engineer (Prius), plane crash.
Melvin M. Webber, 86, American urban designer.

26
Mário Cesariny, 83, Portuguese surrealist painter and author, cancer.
Abu Hafs al-Urduni, 33, Iordan terrorist, killed by Russian troops. 
Leo Chiosso, 86, Italian songwriter.
Dave Cockrum, 63, American comic book creator (X-Men, Legion of Super-Heroes), complications from diabetes.
Isaac Gálvez, 31, Spanish cyclist, cycling accident.
Stephen Heywood, 37, American subject of the film So Much So Fast, amyotrophic lateral sclerosis.
Anthony Jackson, 62, British actor, cancer.
Giorgio Panto, 65, Italian television station owner and separatist politician, helicopter crash.
Graham Roope, 60, British cricketer, heart attack.
Rosa Mia, 81, Filipino actress and director.
Raúl Velasco, 73, Mexican television presenter (Siempre en Domingo), hepatitis C.
Fazlul Karim (scholar), 71, Islamic Scholer and Politician, Pir Shaheb Of Chormonai Darbar and Leader Of  Islami Shashontantra Andolan, Natural Causes .

27
Don Butterfield, 83, American jazz tuba player, played with Dizzy Gillespie and Frank Sinatra, stroke-related illness.
Bebe Moore Campbell, 56, American author (What You Owe Me), brain cancer.
Casey Coleman, 55, American sportscaster, winner of four Emmy Awards, pancreatic cancer.
George Doig, 93, Australian football player.
Alan Freeman, 79, British BBC DJ, natural causes.
Larry Henderson, 89, Canadian first regular broadcaster on CBC Television's The National, natural causes.
Annie Knight, 111, British supercentenarian, oldest person in United Kingdom.
Eddie Mayo, 96, American baseball player, natural causes.
Susan Raab Simonson, 37, American theatre actress and producer, breast cancer.

28
Ralph A. Erickson, 82, American politician.
Rose Mattus, 90, British-born American co-founder of Häagen-Dazs ice cream, natural causes.
Max Merkel, 87, Austrian football player and coach.
Bernard Orchard, 96, British biblical scholar.
Lyubov Polishchuk, 57, Russian actress, spinal disease.
Primo Volpi, 90, Italian cyclist.
Elliot Welles, 79, Austrian-born American Holocaust survivor and B'nai B'rith's prosecutor for Nazi war criminals, heart attack.
Martha Lipton, 93, American Opera singer, Natural Causes .
Mohammad Hanif (mayor), 62, Bangladeshi Politician, Mayor Of Dhaka City Corporation ( 1994 - 2002 ), Multiple Organ Failure .

29
Rosalie Bradford, 63, American Guinness World Record-holder for heaviest woman, most weight lost, complications from obesity.
Allen Carr, 72, English anti-smoking activist, lung cancer.
Şenol Coşkun, 18, Turkish child actor (Zıpçıktı), traffic collision.
Jean Dulieu, 85, Dutch children's writer and comic strip cartoonist.
Leonard Freed, 77, American photojournalist and member of the Magnum Photography Collective, complications of cancer.
Akio Jissoji, 69, Japanese television and film director (Ultraman, Ultra Seven), stomach cancer.
Emmett Kelly, 82, American clown and son of Emmett Kelly, complications from pneumonia.
Leon Niemczyk, 82, Polish actor, lung cancer.
Bishan Singh Ram Singh, 62, Malaysian social activist and environmentalist, pulmonary embolism.
Hanumant Singh, 67, Indian cricketer and International Cricket Council match referee, organ failure due to dengue fever and hepatitis B.
Dewey Readmore Books, 19,  Library cat, euthanized

30
Rafael Buenaventura, 68, Filipino Governor of the Central Bank, kidney cancer.
Colin Cramphorn, 50, British Chief Constable for West Yorkshire, prostate cancer.
Leonard Greene, 88, American aviation safety device inventor, lung cancer.
Perry Henzell, 70, Jamaican film director (The Harder They Come) and author, cancer.
Eli Mohar, 57, Israeli songwriter and columnist, pancreatic cancer.
Shirley Walker, 61, American film score composer, brain aneurysm.

References

2006-11
 11